The Zumbro Parkway Bridge is a historic arch bridge with two  spans over a tributary of the Zumbro River just outside the city of Zumbro Falls in Hyde Park Township, Minnesota, United States.  It was constructed in 1937 by the Works Progress Administration using a modular corrugated iron product known as Multi Plate, and given a masonry veneer with Gothic Revival details.  The bridge was listed on the National Register of Historic Places in 1989 for having state-level significance in the theme of engineering.  It was nominated for being one of Minnesota's finest examples of a stone-faced Multi Plate arch highway bridge, a style used in many of the state's New Deal bridge projects.

See also
 List of bridges on the National Register of Historic Places in Minnesota
 National Register of Historic Places listings in Wabasha County, Minnesota

References

External links
 Zumbro Parkway Bridge (Bridge 3219)–Minnesota Department of Transportation

1937 establishments in Minnesota
Bridges completed in 1937
Road bridges on the National Register of Historic Places in Minnesota
Buildings and structures in Wabasha County, Minnesota
Gothic Revival architecture in Minnesota
Transportation in Wabasha County, Minnesota
Works Progress Administration in Minnesota
Zumbro River
National Register of Historic Places in Wabasha County, Minnesota
Arch bridges in the United States
Steel bridges in the United States